Tangaroa is the Māori god of the sea.

Tangaroa may also refer to:

Animals
Anatoma tangaroa, a sea snail of family Anatomidae
Bathymodiolus tangaroa, a mussel of family Mytilidae
Hirtomurex tangaroa, a sea snail of family Muricidae
Modicus tangaroa, a clingfish of family Gobiesocidae
Tangaroa (spider), a genus of uloborid spiders
Zetela tangaroa, a sea snail of family Solariellidae

People
Tanga Roa (born 1983), Tongan-American professional wrestler
Tangaroa Tangaroa (1921–2009), Cook Islands politician

Other uses
 Tangaroa (album), by New Zealand metal band Alien Weaponry
RV Tangaroa, a research vessel belonging to the National Institute of Water and Atmospheric Research
Tangaroa College, Otara, Auckland, New Zealand
Tangaroa Expedition, a 2006 raft journey from Peru to Polynesia